

Krosno County is a unit of territorial administration and local government (powiat) in Subcarpathian Voivodeship, south-eastern Poland, on the Slovak border. It came into being on January 1, 1999, as a result of the Polish local government reforms passed in 1998. Its administrative seat is the city of Krosno, although the city is not part of the county (it constitutes a separate city county).

As of 2019 its total population is 112,301, out of which the population of Jedlicze is 5,736, that of Rymanów is 3,825, that of Dukla is 2,061, that of Iwonicz-Zdrój is 1,787, and the rural population is 98,892.

Neighbouring counties
Apart from the city of Krosno, Krosno County is bordered by Jasło County to the west, Strzyżów County to the north, and Brzozów County and Sanok County to the east. It also borders Slovakia to the south.

Administrative division
The county is subdivided into ten gminas (four urban-rural and six rural). These are listed in the following table, in descending order of population. (There were previously only nine gminas; Gmina Jaśliska was separated from Gmina Dukla as of January 1, 2010.)

References

 
Krosno